Geiner Alonso Mosquera Becerra (born January 8, 1984 in Chigorodó, Antioquia) is a Colombian sprinter, who specialized in the 400 metres. He won a gold medal at the 2008 Ibero-American Championships, with a time of 46.63 seconds.

Playing career
Mosquera represented Colombia at the 2008 Summer Olympics in Beijing, where he competed for the men's 400 metres. He ran in the fifth heat against seven other athletes, including Belgium's Jonathan Borlée and United States' LaShawn Merritt, both of whom were heavy favorites in this event. He finished the race in seventh place by forty-four hundredths of a second (0.44) behind Grenada's Alleyne Francique, with a time of 46.59 seconds. Mosquera, however, failed to advance into the semi-finals, as he placed forty-fifth overall, and was ranked farther below three mandatory slots for the next round.

References

External links

NBC Olympics Profile

Colombian male sprinters
Living people
Olympic athletes of Colombia
Athletes (track and field) at the 2008 Summer Olympics
Sportspeople from Antioquia Department
1984 births
South American Games silver medalists for Colombia
South American Games medalists in athletics
Competitors at the 2006 South American Games
21st-century Colombian people